Love + Fear (stylised in all caps) is the fourth studio album by Welsh singer Marina Diamandis and her first under the mononym Marina. It was released in full on 26 April 2019 by Atlantic Records, though the album's first half was released on 4 April 2019 as a surprise. Diamandis took a hiatus after she concluded touring in support of her third studio album Froot (2015) with plans of retiring from music. However, she began working on a new record with several producers like Sam de Jong, Oscar Görres, Joel Little, Jack Patterson, Mark Ralph, James Flannigan, and Oscar Holter during its recording.

Love + Fear has been described musically as a pop, dance-pop, synth-pop, and electropop album with a more commercial sound, in comparison to Diamandis' previous albums. Conceived as a double album, each half of the album explores the two nominal emotions referenced in the title, according to the theory by psychologist Elisabeth Kübler-Ross. Love + Fear received positive reviews from music critics and was a commercial success. The album debuted at number five on the UK Albums Chart, becoming the singer's fourth consecutive top 10 album.

The album was supported by four singles, all of which were supplemented by music videos: "Handmade Heaven", "Superstar", "Orange Trees", "To Be Human", and "Karma". It also includes the previously released single "Baby" (2018) with Clean Bandit. The album was announced alongside a tour, which visited the US, Canada, and Europe, which began in April 2019 and concluded in November. An acoustic EP, titled Love + Fear (Acoustic), was released on 13 September 2019.

Background and production
After the concluding the Neon Nature Tour in promotion of her third studio album Froot (2015), Diamandis began writing sessions in Los Angeles for her next record, despite initially dismissing the idea of making a follow-up. In June 2016, Diamandis told Fuse that she had begun writing new material for upcoming songs. However, the sessions were canceled because of her plans of retiring from music, in search of new creative inspiration. Diamandis cited her struggles with depression and stress due the loss of her aunt and her grandmother during promotion for Froot as the main reasons of her near retirement. She also experienced writer's block, which led her to take acting classes. However, Diamandis left those classes and enrolled at the University of London where she studied psychology for six months.

Three months after finishing the course, Diamandis returned to the studio and continue with the songwriting of her fourth album from early 2017 to summer 2018. Some of the songs made before her break were initially instrumented only by piano but were reworked after Diamandis "[fell] back in love with them." The singer was inactive in social media during her hiatus, though she uploaded content occasionally. In December 2016, electronic group Clean Bandit confirmed that "Disconnect", a song they had performed with Diamandis at the 2015 Coachella Valley Music and Arts Festival, would be released on their new album; it was released as a single in June 2017 and she performed it with them at Glastonbury. When Diamandis thought in May 2018 that the album was already finished, she wrote several songs in a trip to Sweden.

To mark a new stage in her career, Diamandis announced via Twitter in 2018 that she would be dropping her "and the Diamonds" moniker to release music as "Marina" (stylised in all caps), explaining that "It took me well over a year to figure out that a lot of my identity was tied up in who I was as an artist... and there wasn't much left of who I was." In November 2018, a second collaboration with Clean Bandit and Puerto Rican singer Luis Fonsi, "Baby", was released, peaking at number 15 in the UK. In July 2018, Diamandis said she was going to Los Angeles to finish the production of Love + Fear. The album was mixed and finished in December 2018.

In an interview in June 2019, Diamandis spoke about the conception of the title and stated, "I think [Love + Fear] can both be motivating forces... I mean there's a reason why we feel fearful - it's from evolutionary reasons. We need fear to survive, we need love but... I think because this whole chapter of my life has had like a psychological backdrop it was a very fitting universal title. I didn't write with this concept in mind I just wrote ready freely. I didn't even know if I was going to do an album I was just writing for the joy of it and then at the end I was like what should I name it? ... I went through and so what the main themes were... [Love + Fear] kept jumping out on me." Diamandis collaborated with several songwriters and producers during the album's production, most of them with close ages to the singer, unlike in her second studio album Electra Heart (2012), where most collaborators were older than her. When asked about the collaborations, Diamandis said, "It's really important as a writer to feel like I'm excited about doing new things... that's why I collaborated a lot on this record... 'Orange Trees', I never would've wrote on my own".

Music and lyrics
Musically, Love + Fear has been described as a subdued, pop, dance-pop, synth-pop, and electropop record. Diamandis described the album as a "contemporary pop record". Its production was characterised to be "pristine", with booming synth lines and beat-driven ballads. Jeffrey Davies of PopMatters classified the album as "likely her most commercial attempt to date". Diamandis described the songwriting in the album to be more honest and direct in comparison to her previous works. Love + Fear is a double album that is split into two eight-track collections (Love and Fear), with each collection exploring psychologist Elisabeth Kübler-Ross' theory that humans are only capable of experiencing the nominal two emotions. Diamandis elaborated on this, saying "There are only two emotions: love and fear. All positive emotions come from love and all negative emotions from fear. From love flows happiness, contentment, peace and joy. From fear comes anger, hate, anxiety and guilt. It's true that there only two primary emotions: love and fear, but it is more accurate to say that there is only love or fear for we cannot feel these two emotions together at exactly the same time. They are opposites. If we are in fear, we are not in a place of love. When we are in love, then we are not in a place of fear."

Songs
Love + Fear opens with "Handmade Heaven", which was described as a musical departure from "the bubblegum pop excess and cheekiness" of Diamandis' first three albums. Lyrically, the song refers to her admiration of nature and the outdoors. During a track-by-track interview for Love + Fear with Apple Music, she revealed that climate change served as a main source of inspiration for the track. During the refrain, she sings alongside several layers of her own vocals, creating a choir-sounding effect; she coos: "In this handmade heaven, I come alive / Blue birds forever, colour the sky". "Superstar" is a synth-pop and electro track that was compared to the sound of Diamandis' second studio album Electra Heart (2012). Lake Schatz from Consequence of Sound described her vocals on the track as "almost operatic" and noted the understated presence of a piano. The singer referred to "Superstar" a "true love song" that "celebrates the hard work that goes into a good relationship".

"Orange Trees" uses vivid imagery and serves as "an ode to the beauty of Earth's natural wonders". According to Diamandis, the song is about the island city of Lefkada in Greece, where her family originated from. Regarding "Karma", she stated that the song's lyrical content was subconsciously inspired by the Harvey Weinstein sexual abuse cases and the consequential viral response that came with the Me Too movement. Diamandis said that the initial idea for the song's subject matter came from a discussion she previously had with her producers regarding various "music industry individuals that were falling from grace." The lyrics of the song see Diamandis confronting an enemy with a "told-you-so" attitude as she sings: "I'm like, 'Oh my god / I think it's karma.'" Brittany Spanos from Rolling Stone felt like Diamandis was describing misogyny in the lyrics, which she noted as a common theme explored on the Fear portion of the album. Love + Fear closes with "Soft to be Strong", a piano ballad where Diamandis seeks kindness as a strength; Kate Solomon of The Independent found the track to be "a worthy message to close an album that probes metallic emotions and deep, universal insecurities."

Release and promotion
On 31 January 2019, Diamandis teased the album by posting a picture on Instagram with the caption "8 Days". The day after, she revealed in an interview the new album would come out some time in early 2019. On 6 February 2019, it was revealed the title of the lead single of the album would be entitled "Handmade Heaven". The single was released on digital platforms on 8 February 2019. A music video for the track directed by Sophie Muller was released concurrently with the song. The album was announced on Instagram on 14 February 2019, with Diamandis revealing it comprised "two 8-track collections that form a set". She released two cover artworks, one for each eight-track collection, and a set of tour dates for the upcoming world tour in support of the release. Every ticket to the tour purchased online through Ticketmaster or Live Nation would include a digital copy of the album. On 4 April 2019, Diamandis released the album's first half, Love, as a surprise. Four days later, she publicly performed the single "Orange Trees" for the first time on Late Night With Seth Meyers. On 4 September 2019, she performed the single "Karma" on Jimmy Kimmel Live!. All singles released prior to Karma were part of the album's first half, Love. "Handmade Heaven" is featured on the soundtrack to the 2019 football simulation game eFootball PES 2020.

Tour

The Love + Fear Tour ran from 29 April to 18 November 2019 and saw Marina play across the United Kingdom, North America, and Europe. The tour included Spring and Fall dates, as well as festival dates across various countries during the Summer. The tour was opened by various artists, including Daya, Allie X, and Broods. 
On 28 May 2019, Diamandis announced a further five UK dates for a "part 2" of the tour. On 17 June 2019, Diamandis announced additional European dates intertwined with the second part of the UK tour. On 16 September 2019, Diamandis announced two extra concerts in Madrid and Amsterdam.

The tour differed from previous tours as Diamandis did not have a band. Instead, she toured with four dancers that also served as backup singers. When asked about the tour, she stated, "[The tour] is contemporary...the format is like a contemporary dance or theatre show." The stage would be slanted and everything was white so projections could show up. This was also the first time Diamandis had a choreography-centric stage show.

The costumes were inspired by Beyoncé's old stage shows. Diamandis stated, "I wanted to have something that was really powerful and female".

Tour dates

Critical reception

Love + Fear received generally positive reviews from contemporary music critics. At Metacritic, which assigns a weighted mean rating out of 100 to reviews from mainstream critics, the album received an average score of 62 based on eight reviews, indicating "generally favourable reviews". Another music-aggregator AnyDecentMusic? gave it 5.4 out of 10, based on their assessment of the critical consensus.

In December 2019, The Irish Times listed "Soft to Be Strong" among the 'Best International Songs of 2019'.

Commercial performance
Love + Fear debuted at number five on the UK Albums Chart, becoming Diamandis' fourth consecutive top 10 album. In Australia, the album reached number 22 on the ARIA Album Charts, making it her third top 50 entry there.

Track listing

Notes
 The CD version of the album includes a version of "Baby" (3:42) with a guitar intro before Luis Fonsi's opening lines.
 The vinyl version of the album includes a version of "Baby" (3:41) which only features Marina and includes a guitar intro.
 "Emotional Machine" features uncredited vocals by Broods.

Personnel
Credits adapted from Tidal.

Love
Musicians

 Marina – lead vocals , featured vocals , backing vocals 
 Clean Bandit – lead artist 
 Luis Fonsi – featured vocals 
 Joel Little – keyboards , drum programming , percussion , synthesizer 
 Captain Cuts – keyboards , programming 
 Sam de Jong – keyboards , programming 
 Oscar Görres – keyboards , programming , percussion , guitar , bass 
 Jack Patterson – keyboards , guitar 
 Oscar Holter – keyboards , programming , percussion , guitar , bass 
 James Flannigan – keyboards , programming , percussion , drums , violin 
 Luke Patterson – piano , percussion , additional drums , trumpet 
 Dan Grech-Marguerat – programming , additional programming 
 Erik Hassle – guitar 
 Mark Ralph – guitar 
 Nakajin – acoustic guitar 
 Grace Chatto – bass 

Technical

 Joel Little – engineering 
 Sam de Jong – engineering 
 Alex Robinson – engineering 
 Jack Patterson – engineering 
 Mike Horner – engineering 
 Ray Charles Brown Jr – engineering 
 Ross Fortune – engineering 
 Tom AD Fuller – engineering 
 James Flannigan – engineering 
 Greg Eliason – assistant engineering 
 Dan Grech-Marguerat – mixing 
 Serban Ghenea – mixing 
 Jack Patterson – mixing 
 Mark Ralph – mixing 
 Geoff Swan – mixing 
 John Hanes – mix engineering , assistant mix engineering 
 Niko Batistini – assistant mix engineering 
 Dave Kutch – mastering 
 Matt Deutchman – coordinating

Fear
Musicians

 Marina – lead vocals , backing vocals 
 Joel Little – drum programming , keyboards , percussion , synthesizer 
 Oscar Görres – backing vocals , keyboards , percussion , programming , ukulele 
 Sam de Jong – keyboards , programming , guitar , bass , drums 
 Mark Ralph – guitar , mandolin , ukulele 
 Caleb Nott – bass , percussion 
 Dan Grech-Marguerat – programming , additional programming 
 Georgia Nott – piano 
 Alex Hope – drum programming , keyboards , percussion , piano , programming 
 James Flannigan – keyboards , percussion , piano , programming 

Technical

 Dave Kutch – masterering 
 Joel Little – engineering 
 Niko Batistini – assistant mix engineering 
 Geoff Swan – mixing 
 Mark Ralph – mixing 
 Sam de Jong – engineering 
 Jack Patterson – mixing 
 Ross Fortune – assistant mix engineering 
 Tom AD Fuller – assistant mix engineering 
 Dan Grech-Marguerat – mixing 
 Matt Deuthman – coordinating 
 James Flannigan – engineering

Charts

Release history

Notes

External links
 Love + Fear on Diamandis' official website

References

2019 albums
Albums produced by Alex Hope (songwriter)
Albums produced by Joel Little
Albums produced by Sam de Jong
Atlantic Records albums
Marina Diamandis albums